Peep Show is the debut album by Goudie. It was recorded at Brooklyn Bridge Studio in Austin, Texas. The song "Julia" is the result of a collaboration between Johnny Goudie and Jane Wiedlin of The Go-Go's. The song "When Will You Be Mine" features vocals by Aimee Mann. The album was recorded twice. The initial sessions took place in Los Angeles with producer Fred Maher and featured Lars Ulrich playing drums on "When Will You Be Mine." The band was not satisfied with the result of the Los Angeles sessions, considering the album too glossy and not edgy enough. They returned to Austin, Texas with producer Mike McCarthy, where they recorded the version of the album that would be released.

Track listing
"Baby Hello"
"Sugar Daddy"
"Tonight"
"Valentine"
"Julia"
"Buy Me"
"Shy"
"Made"
"Strange"
"Terminal"
"Drag City"
"When Will You Be Mine?"

Notes 

2000 albums
Goudie (band) albums